Sander Vos (born 31 January 1967) is a Dutch film editor.

Career 

Vos won the Golden Calf for Best Montage award four times at the Netherlands Film Festival for the following films: Paradise Now (2005), Black Butterflies (2011), Full Contact (2015, awarded in 2016) and Tonio (2016, awarded in 2017).

Vos also edited the film De tranen van Maria Machita (1991) which won the Tuschinski Award as well as the Golden Calf for Best Short Film award at the 1991 Netherlands Film Festival. Other films that Vos edited include Goodbye (1995), Zus & Zo (2001), Winky's Horse (2005) and Tiramisu (2008) as well as the 2008 documentary Beyond the Game.

Awards 

 2005: Golden Calf for Best Montage, Paradise Now
 2011: Golden Calf for Best Montage, Black Butterflies
 2016: Golden Calf for Best Montage, Full Contact
 2017: Golden Calf for Best Montage, Tonio

References

External links 
 

1967 births
Living people
Dutch film editors
Golden Calf winners